Khokon (also spelled as Khokawn) is a Kuki village in the Senapati district of Manipur, India. As per Census of India 2011, there are 33 household with a total population of 189 persons, out of which 96 are male while 93 are female.

Etymology
The term Khokon means a zig-zag village.

History
Khokon village was established in the first decade of the 19th century. The original village located in Ukhrul district between Kachai and Phungtal villages. It was situated at the top of the mountain. During those years there was much rivalry among the Tangkhuls and headhunting was common among them. In such circumstances Khokon villagers due to their sheer physical strength and modern warfare they controlled the warring clans and villages in Ukhrul district, and as a result brought about the much needed peace and tranquility in the area. In post-independence India, the rising Naga nationalism and militancy led some of the Tangkhul nationalists to serve quit notice to Khokon villagers forgetting their contribution in the past. Their village was burnt down by Naga nationalists in 1961. As a result they left their homesteads in 1961.

The chief of Khokon Pu Ngulthong Haokip reestablish the village again in Saikul subdivision in 1979.

Location
Khokon village is located at 24°59'33.3"N latitude, and 93°59'47.8"E longitude. It is situated at a height of 790 m above sea level, and just about 35 Kilometres from Imphal, the capital city of Manipur.

Literacy
As per the Census of India 2011, Khokon has a literacy rate of 56.68%, out of which the male population is 61.05% and female is 52.17%.

Church
The people in the village had been largely converted during the 19th century, and they are affiliated to Kuki Baptist Convention, a Baptist Kuki denomination in Northeast India.

Occupation
Even though Khokonites were traditionally cultivators and animal rearers, with the passage of time they largely shifted to small businesses and other skilled professions such as knitting and yarning. The educated ones are engaged in teaching and research in various universities of India and also as medical practitioners. A sections of youths also migrated to different metropolitan cities in the country to work in various companies and BPOs.

References

Villages in Sadar Hills
Villages in Kangpokpi district